Crinolamia kermadecensis is a species of sea snail, a marine gastropod mollusk in the family Eulimidae.

Distribution
This species occurs in the following locations:

 Norwegian waters

References

External links
 To World Register of Marine Species

Eulimidae
Gastropods described in 1964